, also known as She, the Ultimate Weapon, is a Japanese manga series written and illustrated by Shin Takahashi. It was serialized in Shogakukan's seinen manga magazine Weekly Big Comic Spirits from December 1999 to October 2001, with its chapters collected in seven tankōbon volumes.

A 13-episode anime television series adaptation by Gonzo aired from July to September 2002. A two-episode side-story original video animation (OVA) by Studio Fantasia was released in 2005. A live-action film adaptation premiered in January 2006.

Both the manga and the anime series were licensed for English release in North America by Viz Media. The anime was later licensed in 2014 by Sentai Filmworks and released under the title She, the Ultimate Weapon.

Plot
The story begins with Shuji, a high school student in a Hokkaidō coastal city, walking up to an observatory and reminiscing about his girlfriend, Chise; there he finds her exchange diaries that she purposefully left behind. The ensuing story is narrated by Shuji through flashbacks while reading Chise's diary. Chise, a fellow student in his class, declares her love for Shuji at the beginning of the series. However, Chise is very shy and Shuji is insensitive: neither know how to express their feelings very well, but they do indeed have feelings for each other.

One day, while Shuji is shopping in Sapporo, unknown bombers attack the city in broad daylight. He and his friends run for cover, but notice a fast and small flying object shooting down the enemy bombers. Separated from his friends, Shuji wanders through the wreckage—only to stumble upon Chise; here she has metal wings and weapons—apparently grafted onto her body. She tells him she has become the ultimate weapon, without her knowledge or consent, and that she is seen by the Japan Self-Defense Forces (JSDF) as the last hope for defending Japan. In the anime, it is not apparent why Chise was chosen to be the ultimate weapon or why the country is under attack. It was not until the OVA episodes were released that an explanation for Chise being chosen was offered: her body has the highest degree of compatibility with the weapon system.

This story focuses primarily on Chise's fading humanity as her condition worsens. The main conflict is within Chise herself; she questions whether or not she is human. Her soul is constantly trying to be a normal girl, while her body succumbs to the devastating effects of the weapon cell within her. Fundamentally important to the plot is the relationship between Shuji and Chise. From this, the resolution of the conflict follows. In the end, she is able to realize who she truly is.

A number of minor characters who do not necessarily know of Chise's role in the war have sub-plots that concern everyday people in the context of war: a woman whose husband is constantly away from home, a school boy who joins the army to protect his girlfriend, a girl whose civilian boyfriend is killed in a bombing, and others.

Characters

A shy, clumsy girl with very little self-esteem and has poor grades in everything except for World History. She was constantly hospitalized in Tokyo during her elementary years, and thus, has very few friends (except for Akemi). She starts dating Shuji, with Akemi's help, and tries to make her relationship work with him despite his apparently aloof personality. However, Chise is very inexperienced and does not know much about relationships to the point she reads shōjo manga for advice. She was turned into the ultimate weapon against her will and the series revolves around her and her fading humanity. As Chise's weapon-side starts to take over, her heart stops beating, her body lacks warmth and her sense of taste and touch are dulled, but other senses (especially sight) are accentuated. Her condition worsens and her humanity seems to fade away entirely. In the final episodes of the anime, she appears to be nothing more than a cold, ruthless machine that delights in her growing, destructive powers and killing people without mercy. Her love for Shuji is the last of her humanity. Throughout the story, she tries to come to terms with her body while still trying to convince herself that she is still human. She believes that she is nothing more than a weapon designed to kill. Her boyfriend Shuji, however, is able to help her break free by showing her that she is able to protect the ones she loves, and that only a human can experience the feeling of love. This helps Chise destroy the body in which she was trapped, and she realizes that she is indeed human. This brings to question what is meant by the term "ultimate weapon" used throughout the story. Chise's soul had been the only thing that was able to destroy her body, which was claimed to be the most powerful thing in the world.

A somewhat antisocial 17-year-old high school student who gets higher than average grades and used to be on his school's track team. Shuji is very unsure of his initial feelings for Chise and feels that their relationship is more trouble than its worth, though his feelings deepen as the story progresses. Not long after the two became much closer, they decided to simply become friends again and leave their closer relationship alone. This gives him time to realize his love for Chise and he eventually wishes to give the relationship another try. However, things get complicated when his first love, Fuyumi, reappears in town. He is the only civilian who knows Chise is the ultimate weapon and promises that he will never divulge her secret. Shuji is feeling constantly guilty and useless because his irresponsible actions tend to hurt Chise. Later on in the series, he comes to accept his love for Chise and vows to protect her and be by her side at all costs.

She is a childhood friend and classmate of both Chise and Shuji. Akemi is also Chise's best friend, and usually gives her advice on love. A typical tomboy, but she has some insecurities about her appearance, always questioning why any man would fall for her. She always comes to Chise's defense whenever Shuji inadvertently hurts Chise verbally.

Shuji's best friend. Atsushi is a mature, open, down-to-earth guy who holds a fascination for the military. He decides to join the Japan Self-Defense Forces to protect the girl he loves.

Regiment leader, Fuyumi's husband, and the sole survivor of Chise's first platoon. He is very much like Shuji in terms of looks and personality and that is why Chise is initially attracted to him. He treats Chise like an ordinary girl, which is why Chise likes him. He is one of the characters to be featured in the OVA, where Mizuki, his former commander, was shown to have a crush on him.

Tetsu's wife. She used to train the track team when she was younger and her students called her "Fuyumi-senpai" because of the close age difference. She is always feeling lonely as her husband, Tetsu, is never home since he is always away in the army. It is soon revealed that Shuji and Fuyumi were once in love. Shuji explains that his love for her was never true; he simply wanted to become physically closer to her.

Seen only in the OVA, Mizuki was the prototype for the weapon system which would later be used on Chise. She was an officer who was badly wounded in an attack, but returned to the battlefield because of the prototype weapon system. She also had a crush on Tetsu, her former deputy. She was one of the very few people sympathetic (and empathetic since she, too, was a weapon) towards Chise.
Take

The most extroverted guy in Shuji's circle of friends and Yukari's boyfriend. Take is the first one to get a girlfriend in Shuji's group. His girlfriend is named Yukari.
Nori

The most immature guy in Shuji's circle of friends. Nori is a naive high-school student, who believed that the war would never reach their hometown and they should stop worrying about it. He desperately wants to have a girlfriend, and is slightly jealous of Take for having one.
Yukari

Take's girlfriend. After her boyfriend's death, she leaves the school. Soon after that, she gets another boyfriend and on the surface, claims she will never love anyone seriously again.
Takamura

Young soldier on Chise's former company. He admires Chise very much, telling her that her combat skills saved his life.
Kawahara

Head scientist in charge of Chise. He is a nervous man that perpetually wipes his forehead with a dark-blue cloth.

Media

Manga
Written and illustrated by Shin Takahashi, Saikano was serialized in Shogakukan's seinen manga magazine Weekly Big Comic Spirits from December 27, 1999, to October 29, 2001. Shogakukan collected its chapters in seven tankōbon volumes, released from May 30, 2000, to December 25, 2001. A one-shot chapter was published on January 30, 2006; it was later collected in a gaiden volume, along other one-shot chapters, released on July 19, 2006. Shogakukan re-released the series in four aizoban volumes from September 30 to December 26, 2019.

In North America, the manga was licensed for English release by Viz Media in 2003. The seven volumes were released from June 16, 2004, to January 10, 2006.

Anime

A 13-episode anime television series adaptation by Gonzo was broadcast on the cable television station Family Gekijo from July 2 to September 24, 2002. A Blu-ray box, which included the 13 episodes and the two OVA episodes, was released on September 12, 2018.

In North America, the series was licensed by Viz Media. The series was collected in four DVD sets, released from April 27 to November 9, 2004. A DVD box set was released on November 15, 2005. Sentai Filmworks relicensed the series in 2014, under the title She, the Ultimate Weapon. It was released on a single DVD set on April 7, 2015, and on Blu-ray on October 26, 2021.

In the United Kingdom, the series was licensed by Manga Entertainment, under the title She, the Ultimate Weapon, and released on three DVD sets from May 15 to August 21, 2006. In Australia and New Zealand, the series was licensed by Madman Entertainment and released in four DVD sets from July 21, 2004, to January 12, 2005; a complete DVD set was released on December 7, 2005.

Original video animation
A two-episode original video animation (OVA) side-story by Studio Fantasia, titled Saikano: Another Love Song, was released on August 5 and September 21, 2005. Viz Media released the OVA on May 9, 2006. In the United Kingdom, the OVA was released by Manga Entertainment on January 29, 2007.

Live-action film

Notes

References

External links

 
  
  
 
  
  
 

 
1999 manga
2002 anime television series debuts
2005 anime OVAs
2006 films
Anime and manga set in Hokkaido
Gonzo (company)
Japan Self-Defense Forces in fiction
Romance anime and manga
Science fiction anime and manga
Seinen manga
Sentai Filmworks
Shogakukan manga
Studio Fantasia
Toei Company
Viz Media anime
Viz Media manga
War in anime and manga
Japanese science fiction films
Japanese romance films